Robert William Scott (January 29, 1937 – November 5, 1990) was an American musician, record producer, and songwriter.

Biography
Scott was born in Mount Pleasant, New York, United States, and became a pianist, vibraphonist, and singer, and could also play the accordion, cello, clarinet, and double bass. He studied under Edvard Moritz at the La Follette School of Music at the age of eight, and was working professionally at 11. In 1952, he began touring with Louis Prima, and also toured and performed with Gene Krupa, Lester Young, and Tony Scott in the 1950s. In 1956 he hit the U.S. Billboard Hot 100 with the song "Chain Gang", peaking at number 13. It sold over one million copies, and was awarded a gold disc.

Career and Grammy Award 
As a bandleader, he did sessions for Verve, ABC-Paramount, Bethlehem, and Musicmasters. As a songwriter, he won a Grammy Award for Best Instrumental Composition for the song "A Taste of Honey". In addition to "A Taste of Honey", Scott also co-wrote the song "He Ain't Heavy, He's My Brother". In the 1960s he became a music teacher and studied again under Moritz, but occasionally recorded as well, including a Nat King Cole tribute album released in the 1980s. He also composed film soundtracks, including the scores to Slaves (1969), Joe (1970), and Who Says I Can't Ride a Rainbow! (1971). During the 1980s he composed music for classical guitar, harp, and piano. He also arranged for jazz and easy listening musicians such as Les and Larry Elgart.

Death
Scott died of lung cancer in New York City, at the age of 53.

Discography

As leader
 The Compositions of Bobby Scott (Bethlehem, 1955)
 Scott Free (ABC-Paramount, 1955)
 Bobby Scott and 2 Horns (ABC-Paramount, 1956)
 Serenta (Verve, 1957)
 Bobby Scott Plays the Music of Leonard Bernstein (Verve, 1959)
 The Compleat Musician (Atlantic, 1960)
 A Taste of Honey (Atlantic, 1960)
 Joyful Noises (Mercury, 1962)
 When the Feeling Hits You! (Mercury, 1963)
 108 Pounds of Heartache (Mercury, 1963)
 I Had a Ball (Mercury, 1964)
 My Heart in My Hands (Columbia, 1967)
 Star (Columbia, 1969)
 Robert William Scott (Warner Bros., 1970)
 From Eden to Canaan (Columbia, 1976)
 Forecast: Rain with Sunny Skies (Columbia, 1978)
 For Sentimental Reasons (MusicMasters, 1990)
 Slowly (MusicMasters, 1991)
 Bobby Scott Sings the Best of Lerner and Loewe (LPTime, 2010)

As sideman
 Chet Baker, Baby Breeze (Limelight, 1965)
 Buddy Emmons, Steel Guitar Jazz (Mercury, 1964)
 Quincy Jones, Golden Boy (Mercury, 1964)
 Quincy Jones, Quincy Plays for Pussycats (Mercury, 1965)
 Quincy Jones, In the Heat of the Night OST (United Artists, 1967)

References

External links

1937 births
1990 deaths
American bandleaders
Singers from New York (state)
Songwriters from New York (state)
People from Mount Pleasant, New York
Deaths from lung cancer in New York (state)
ABC Records artists
Verve Records artists
Atlantic Records artists
Mercury Records artists
20th-century American singers
20th-century American male singers
American male songwriters